Albert V. DiVirgilio (born c. 1942) was a Massachusetts politician who served as the 53rd Mayor of Lynn, Massachusetts.

DiVirgilio spent eighteen years as a member of the Lynn City Council before defeating mayor Antonio J. Marino in the 1985 mayoral election.

Under DiVirgilio's leadership, Lynn desegregated their public schools. Lynn also banned the sale of pit bulls while DiVirgilio was mayor.

DiVirgilio lost reelection in 1991 to City Councilor Patrick J. McManus.

After leaving politics, DiVirgilio opened an insurance agency. 

His son Albert DiVirgilio, Jr. is a former Lynn City Councilor.

Notes

Massachusetts city council members
Mayors of Lynn, Massachusetts
1940s births
Living people
Place of birth missing (living people)